This list is intended to provide a comprehensive listing of entries in the National Register of Historic Places in the Town of Riverhead, New York.  The locations of National Register properties for which the latitude and longitude coordinates are included below, may be seen in a Google map.

Listings 

|}

See also
National Register of Historic Places listings in New York
National Register of Historic Places listings in Suffolk County, New York

References

External links
NRHP applications for New York State sites (Note, interface works best with Microsoft Internet Explorer browser;  hit "Results" after searching, to actually see the results).

Riverhead (town), New York

National Register of Historic Places in Suffolk County, New York